Iranian religions also known as Persian religions are, in the context of comparative religion, a grouping of religious movements that originated in the Iranian (Persian) plateau (or Greater Iran).

Background
The beliefs, activities, and cultural events of the ancient Iranians in ancient Iran are complex matters. The ancient Iranians made references to a combination of several Aryans and non-Aryan tribes. Aryans, or ancient Iranians, worshiped natural elements such as the sun, sunlight and thunder, but they eventually shifted their attention mostly to a single god, whilst acknowledging others. The Iranian ancient prophet, Zoroaster, reformed Iranian religious beliefs to a form of henotheism/monotheism. The Gathas, hymns of Zoroaster's Avesta, brought monotheistic ideas to Persia, while through the Yashts and Yasna, mentions are made to polytheism and earlier creeds. The Vedas and the Avesta have both served researchers as important resources in discovering early Aryan beliefs and ideas.

Antiquity
Proto-Indo-Iranian religion: The various beliefs and practices from which the later indigenous religion of the Iranian peoples evolved. This religion was also the origin of the Indian religions. 
 Ancient Iranian religion: The ancient religion of the Iranian peoples
 Scythian religion: The religion of the Scythians and precursor to modern Uatsdin. Some researchers further speculate that Daevas may partly be based on Scythian gods, hence further influences across Iranian religions as a whole.
 Zoroastrianism: The present-day umbrella term for the indigenous native beliefs and practices of the Iranian peoples. While present-day Zoroastrianism is monolithic, a continuation of the elite form of the Sasanian Empire, in antiquity it had several variants or denominations, differing slightly by location, ethnic affiliation and historical period. It once had large population and high diversity.
 Zurvanism: By the late Achaemenid Empire, Zoroastrianism was also evident as Zurvanism (Zurvanite Zoroastrianism), a monist dualism that had a following as late as the Sasanian Empire.
 Mazdakism: A late-5th or early-6th century proto-socialist gnosticism that sought to do away with private property.
 Mithraism: A mystery religion centred around the proto-Zoroastrian Persian god Mithras that was practised in the Roman Empire from about the 1st to the 4th century CE
 Manichaeism: A 3rd century ditheistic religion that may have been influenced by Mandaeism. Manichaeans believe in a "Father of Greatness" (Aramaic: Abbā dəRabbūṯā, Persian: pīd ī wuzurgīh) and observe Him to be the highest deity (of light).
 Yazdanism
 Yazidism

Medieval period
Some religionists made syncretic teachings of Islam and local beliefs and cults such as Iranian paganism, Zurvanism, Manichaeism and Zoroastrianism.
 The early Islamic period saw the development of Persian mysticism, a traditional interpretation of existence, life and love with Perso-Islamic Sufi monotheism as its practical aspect. This development believed in a direct perception of spiritual truth (God), through mystic practices based on divine love.
 Khurramites, a 9th-century religious and political movement based on the 8th century teachings of Sunpadh, who preached a syncretism of Shia Islam and Zoroastrianism. Under Babak Khorramdin, the movement sought the redistribution of private wealth and the abolition of Islam.
 Behafaridians, an 8th-century cult movement around the prophet Behafarid. Although the movement is considered to have its roots in Zoroastrianism, Behafarid and his followers were executed on charges (made by Zoroastrians) of harm to both Zoroastrianism and Islam.
 Yarsan, a religious order of Yazdanism, which is believed to have been founded in the 16th century. Yazdanism promulgated the belief in a God manifest as one primary and five secondary avatars to form with God the Holy Seven.

Modern
 Assianism/Uatsdin, revival of Ossetian ethnic religion (see: Ossetian mythology)
 Roshanniya Movement, a set of monotheistic teachings of Pir Roshan which his people followed.
 Bábism, a mid-19th century monotheistic religion founded by the Báb that was a predecessor of the Baháʼí Faith. 
 Baháʼí Faith, an emerging monotheistic religion founded by Bahá'u'lláh, a 19th-century Persian exile.

See also

Religion of Iranian-Americans
Dabestan-e Mazaheb

References

Bibliography
 Alessandro Bausani, Religion in Iran: From Zoroaster to Bahaullah, Bibliotheca Persica, 2000
Richard Foltz, Religions of Iran: From Prehistory to the Present, London: Oneworld, 2013.

External links

 
Religions, Iranian
Indo-European religion